Giovanni da San Giovanni (20 March 1592 – 9 December 1636), also known as Giovanni Mannozzi,  was an Italian painter of the early Baroque period, active in Florence.

Biography
Born in San Giovanni Valdarno, he trained under Matteo Rosselli. He is also said to have studied architectural perspective from Giulio Parigi. He traveled to Rome where he admired the fresco painted in 1614 by Guido Reni, depicting the Aurora.

He was soon called back to Florence. Mannozzi started the decoration of the Sala degli Argenti in the Palazzo Pitti and planned decorations at Villa La Petraia. In 1615 he painted two ceiling canvases of Putti Supporting the profile of Michelangelo for the Casa Buonarroti and in the same period frescoed  a choir of musician-angels for the dome of the church of the Ognissanti in Florence. He also painted five lunettes showing scenes from the Life of St Francis in the cloister of the Ognissanti. In 1619–1620 he directed the façade decoration of Palazzo dell'Antella in Piazza Santa Croce of Florence.

His masterpiece is said to be frescoes in the chapel of Saint Catherine inside the Palazzo Rospigliosi-Pallavicini in Pistoia. While escaping Florence during the plague, he painted some frescoes in the lunettes in the Santuario della Madonna della Fontenuova in Monsummano Terme. On the left internal wall of the chorus of the church of San Bartolomeo in Cutigliano, is a canvas of Mannozzi's the Circumcision (1620). He painted a fresco cycle on the vault  of the Mellini Chapel in Santa Maria del Popolo which displays The Story of Saint Nicholas of Tolentino in 1623–24.

He died in 1636 and was buried in the church of San Pier Gattolino in Florence. His biography was featured by Filippo Baldinucci.

Gallery

References

Grove encyclopedia at Artnet

1592 births
1636 deaths
People from the Province of Arezzo
16th-century Italian painters
Italian male painters
Italian Baroque painters
Painters from Tuscany